A.E.L. 1964 B.C. (Greek: Α.Ε.Λ. 1964 K.A.E.) is a Greek professional basketball team.

The club is located in Larissa, Greece, a city that is part of the Thessaly periphery. The team is a part of the AEL 1964 multi-sports club. When the team competed in the top-tier Greek League, they played their home games at the Larissa Neapolis Arena.

Logos

Team's names
AEL 1964: (1993–2009)Team Colors: Maroon and White
G.S. Olympia Larissa: (2009–2010)Team Colors: Orange and Green 
AEL 1964: (2010–Present)Team Colors: Maroon and White

History
The Greek basketball club Gymnastikos S. Larissas was founded in Larissa in 1928. In 2006, Gymnastikos merged with the multi-sports club of AEL 1964, which did not have a fully professional level men's basketball section at the time. Gymnastikos' basketball team then became the new basketball section for AEL 1964, under the new name of AEL 1964 G.S., with the newly merged club retaining all of the rights and history of the original club, G.S. Larissas.

In 2009, AEL 1964 G.S. then merged with another basketball club from Larissa, Olympia Larissa, to form G.S. Olympia Larissa. G.S. Olympia Larissa finished last in the Greek Basket League 2009–10 season, and that combined with financial problems, caused it to be relegated down to the Greek lower divisions. As a result, in 2010, the two clubs of AEL 1964 and Olimpia Larissa, separated back from each other, after having merged.

AEL then continued on for the 2010–11 season, under the name of AEL 1964, playing in the Greek lower divisions. A new independent club based on the original Gymnastikos S. Larissas basketball section, called Nea Gymnastikos S. Larissas, was also formed in 2011. This was because 5 years time had passed since the original Gymnastikos club had merged with AEL 1964, and in the original merger agreement, it allowed for another new club to form locally using the Gymnastikos name and logo, after 5 years had passed.

Arena
AEL plays their home games at the Larissa Neapolis Arena, which can seat up to 5,500 people for basketball games.

Roster

Notable players

 Nestoras Kommatos
 Giannis Kyriakopoulos
 Dimitris Bogdanos
 Giorgos Apostolidis
 Markos Kolokas
 Nikos Papanikolopoulos
 Michalis Tsairelis
 Fotios Lampropoulos
 Sotirios Manolopoulos
 Marios Matalon
 Theodoros Zaras
 Zlatko Bolić
 Rudy Mbemba
 Amit Tamir
 Héctor Romero
 Sammy Mejia
 Arthur Lee
 Rod Brown
 Torin Francis
 Billy Keys
 David Teague
 Lance Williams

Head coaches
 Yannis Christopoulos

See also
G.S. Olympia Larissa
Gymnastikos S. Larissas

References

External links 
AEL Athletic Club website 
Eurobasket.com Team Page

Basketball teams in Greece
Sport in Larissa